Robert Bryant or Rob Bryant may refer to:

 Clive Joseph Robin "Rob" Bryant (born 1947; later known as Uncle Rob Bryant), Aboriginal Australian elder, founding director of Bangarra Dance Theatre
 Robert Bryant (mathematician) (born 1953), American mathematician
 Robert G. Bryant, American professor of chemistry
 Robert Bryant (water polo) (born 1958), Australian former water polo player

See also
Bob Bryant (disambiguation)
Bobby Bryant (disambiguation)